Aperostoma is a genus of gastropods belonging to the family Neocyclotidae.

The species of this genus are found in America.

Species:

Aperostoma allantayum 
Aperostoma amazonense 
Aperostoma balsasense 
Aperostoma belli 
Aperostoma blanchetium 
Aperostoma bogotense 
Aperostoma boliviense 
Aperostoma cardozi 
Aperostoma carmioli 
Aperostoma castaneum 
Aperostoma caucaense 
Aperostoma cingulatum 
Aperostoma columbiense 
Aperostoma cumingi 
Aperostoma currani 
Aperostoma depressum 
Aperostoma dilatatum 
Aperostoma dunkeri 
Aperostoma fasciatum 
Aperostoma filoliratum 
Aperostoma fischeri 
Aperostoma fultoni 
Aperostoma inca 
Aperostoma inconspicuum 
Aperostoma indecisum 
Aperostoma laxatum 
Aperostoma leai 
Aperostoma masvense 
Aperostoma merrilli 
Aperostoma mexicanum 
Aperostoma nanum 
Aperostoma nevadense 
Aperostoma olivaceum 
Aperostoma paezense 
Aperostoma paezicolum 
Aperostoma pailaense 
Aperostoma palmeri 
Aperostoma pazi 
Aperostoma perezi 
Aperostoma peruense 
Aperostoma peruvianum 
Aperostoma popayanum 
Aperostoma primigenia 
Aperostoma pulchellum 
Aperostoma redfieldi 
Aperostoma salengoense 
Aperostoma schunkei 
Aperostoma smile 
Aperostoma subcingulatum 
Aperostoma superstructum 
Aperostoma translucidum 
Aperostoma translucidum trinitense
Aperostoma umbilicatum 
Aperostoma utriaense 
Aperostoma veracochanum 
Aperostoma viridulum 
Aperostoma walkeri

References

Neocyclotidae